Mohamed Fungafunga predominantly recognized for his stage names Jengua and Mzee Jengua was a veteran Tanzanian actor and comedian who appeared in more than one hundred films and television shows in a career that spanned more than 15 years.

Career
Fungafunga's fame began in the early 2000s when he was cast in drama series organized by the 'Chemchemu Arts Group' in the drama he acted as a parent who does not value his daughters and refuses to send them to school while he has a relationship with the students. Fungafunga gained popularity due to his brutal characters and his desire to date young girls. In 2013, he appeared in award winning film, Foolish Age featuring Elizabeth Michael. He also collaborated with Mzee Majuto in 'Siri ya Marehemu' franchise.

Death
Fungafunga died  on December 15, 2020 at Mkuranga in the Pwani Region after long struggle with stroke. Fungafunga was buried on Wednesday December 16, 2020 in the afternoon at the Mburahati Cementry in Dar es Salaam.

References

External links
Mohamed Fungafunga in BongoCinema

Year of birth missing
20th-century births
2020 deaths
21st-century Tanzanian actors
Tanzanian comedians